Belgrade is a town in Kennebec County, Maine, United States. Its population was 3,250 at the 2020 census. However, its population approximately doubles during the summer months as part-year residents return to seasonal camps on the shores of Great Pond, Long Pond and Messalonskee Lake. Belgrade includes the villages of North Belgrade, Belgrade Depot and Belgrade Lakes (or The Village). It is included in the Augusta, Maine micropolitan New England City and Town Area.

History

The land was originally owned by the Plymouth Company, from which inhabitants obtained their titles. Called Washington Plantation, it was first settled in 1774 by Philip Snow from New Hampshire. On February 3, 1796, it was incorporated as Belgrade, named after Belgrade, Serbia. The surface of the town is uneven, much of it covered by water in the form of a connected chain of lakes. The largest lake is Great Pond, which dominates the town. Agriculture became the chief occupation of the inhabitants, with potatoes the principal crop.

Outlets of the ponds provided water power for mills. In 1859, there was a shovel factory and spool factory, as well as several sawmills and gristmills. By 1886, there were also factories that made rakes, shingles, excelsior, scythes and boxes. With the arrival of the railroad, Belgrade developed into a tourist resort of fishing, boating and lakeside cottages. The Belgrade Hotel, designed by noted Portland architect John Calvin Stevens, was built at Belgrade Lakes. The town was an annual summertime destination for the writers E.B. White and Ernest Thompson. The latter's sojourns at Great Pond inspired his 1979 play On Golden Pond, which was made into the Academy Award–winning 1981 movie, On Golden Pond. Belgrade Lake is central to the short story Once More to the Lake by E.B.White. In 1998, a semi-private golf course named Belgrade Lakes Golf Club was opened, which was named to the Golf Digest top 100 list for greatest public courses.

Geography

Belgrade is drained by the Belgrade Stream.

The town is crossed by 11, 27, 135 and 225. It borders the towns of Smithfield to the northeast, Oakland and Sidney to the east, Manchester and Readfield to the south, Mount Vernon to the southwest, and Rome to the northwest.

Demographics

2010 census

As of the census of 2010, there were 3,189 people, 1,265 households, and 935 families living in the town. The racial makeup of the town was 98.3% White, 0.2% African American, 0.1% Native American, 0.1% Asian, and 1.3% from two or more races. Hispanic or Latino of any race were 0.5% of the population.

There were 1,265 households, of which 33.4% had children under the age of 18 living with them, 60.8% were married couples living together, 9.0% had a female householder with no husband present, 4.1% had a male householder with no wife present, and 26.1% were non-families. 19.6% of all households were made up of individuals, and 9.1% had someone living alone who was 65 years of age or older. The average household size was 2.51 and the average family size was 2.85.

The median age in the town was 43.8 years. 22.7% of residents were under the age of 18; 6% were between the ages of 18 and 24; 23.2% were from 25 to 44; 33.5% were from 45 to 64; and 14.6% were 65 years of age or older. The gender makeup of the town was 49.5% male and 50.5% female.

2000 census

As of the census of 2000, there were 2,978 people, 1,178 households, and 876 families living in the town. The racial makeup of the town was 98.69% White, 0.10% African American, 0.10% Native American, 0.20% Asian, 0.13% Pacific Islander, 0.03% from other races, and 0.74% from two or more races. Hispanic or Latino of any race were 0.47% of the population.

There were 1,178 households, out of which 34.8% had children under the age of 18 living with them, 62.7% were married couples living together, 8.2% had a female householder with no husband present, and 25.6% were non-families. 18.9% of all households were made up of individuals, and 6.5% had someone living alone who was 65 years of age or older.  The average household size was 2.52 and the average family size was 2.89.

In the town, the population was spread out, with 25.3% under the age of 18, 5.7% from 18 to 24, 30.0% from 25 to 44, 27.5% from 45 to 64, and 11.5% who were 65 years of age or older.  The median age was 40 years. For every 100 females, there were 93.0 males.  For every 100 females age 18 and over, there were 91.6 males.

The median income for a household in the town was $39,053, and the median income for a family was $42,321. Males had a median income of $32,226 versus $24,962 for females. The per capita income for the town was $20,407.  About 8.4% of families and 9.6% of the population were below the poverty line, including 11.3% of those under age 18 and 9.8% of those age 65 or over.

Economy

Belgrade is largely a commuter town and relies on tourism in the summer.

Belgrade Lakes Golf Club is ranked in the Top 100 Greatest Public Courses – The only course in New England to be in the top 100 List and the Number 1 Course in Maine.

The Village Inn and Tavern

Days Store

Gagne & Son Concrete Products

Hammond Lumber Company – retail building materials and sawmill

Notable people

 Joseph Force Crater, New York judge who disappeared under suspicious circumstances; had a summer cabin in Belgrade
 Anson P. Morrill, congressman, 24th governor of Maine
 Lot M. Morrill, U.S. Secretary of the Treasury, U.S. senator, 28th governor of Maine
 Harold Alfond, shoe manufacturer and philanthropist, had a summer cabin in Belgrade
 Wyatt Omsberg, Major League Soccer player
 Olin Sewall Pettingill Jr, naturalist, author and filmmaker
 John Franklin Spalding, Episcopal Bishop of Colorado
 Greenlief T. Stevens, military officer

References

External links
 Official website
 Belgrade Public Library
 Belgrade Historical Society

Towns in Kennebec County, Maine
1774 establishments in the Thirteen Colonies
Towns in Maine